Erythrodiplax berenice (Drury, 1773), commonly known as the Seaside Dragonlet, is a dragonfly of the genus Erythrodiplax found mainly in salt marshes of the eastern United States.  It is unique among dragonflies of the western hemisphere in that it can breed in seawater.

References

Libellulidae
Odonata of North America